Tim White (born 1983) is an American producer whose films include King Richard and Ingrid Goes West. 

In 2022, White was nominated, along with his brother Trevor and Will Smith, for an Academy Award for Best Picture for King Richard but did not win.

White joined the Academy of Motion Picture Arts and Sciences and the Producers Guild of America in 2022. He routinely shares producer duties with his brother, Trevor White.

Early life
White grew up in Annapolis, Maryland, where he attended The Key School. His mother, Patti, is a documentary film maker and is director and co-founder of the Annapolis Film Festival. White attended Williams College as an undergraduate, graduating in 2005. While at Williams, he played varsity tennis and won a national championship.

Filmography
All listings come from the Internet Movie Database.

Accolades

References

External links
 
 

1983 births
Living people
American film producers
Williams College alumni